Shaikh Zayed Medical Complex, Lahore (SZMC) is one of the premier medical institutions and the first facility offering liver transplant (جگر ٹرانسپلانٹ) in Pakistan. located at the geographic center of Lahore, Pakistan.

History

Shaikh Zayed Medical Complex, Lahore Started as a donation from Shaikh Zayed bin Sultan Al Nahyan and people of United Arab Emirates was commissioned on 8 September as Shaikh Zayed Federal Postgraduate Medical Institute and Shaikh Zayed Hospital, Lahore  in the year 1986, comprising 
Shaikh Zayed Postgraduate Medical Institute (SZPGMI)()
Shaikh Zayed Hospital, Lahore (SZHL)
National Health Research Complex (NHRC)()

The Complex now has five components
Shaikh Zayed Postgraduate Medical Institute (SZPGMI)
Shaikh Zayed Hospital Lahore (SZHL)
Shaikh Khalifa bin Zayed Al Nahyan Medical & Dental College (SKZMDC).
National Health Research Complex (NHRC)
National Institute of Kidney Diseases (NIKD)
Shaikha Fatima Institute of Nursing and Health Sciences (SFINHS)

Shaikh Zayed Hospital, Lahore initially comprised 360 beds continued to expand to meet the increasing demands in diagnostic and treatment facilities; comfort and convenience; while broadening the services and deepening the levels of expertise and healthcare. The first expansion was seen in the year 2004 when the number of beds increased to 713. In keeping with the pace of growth, the present bed strength has increased to 1050 bedded.
All the departments are recognized by the College of Physicians and Surgeons of Pakistan for FCPS training.

Chairman & Dean  

Prof. Dr. Mateen Izhar a renowned Professor of Microbiology & Consultant Medical Microbiologist is currently serving as Chairman & Dean of Shaikh Zayed Medical Complex, Lahore.

Principal
Prof. Dr. Mateen Izhar also serving as Principal پرنسپل of Shaikh Khalifa Bin Zayed Al-Nahyan Medical and Dental College.

Facilities Available
 Accident & Emergency 24/7
 Gastroenterology with services of endoscopy, Colonoscopy and ERCP procedures
 Liver Transplant
 Renal Transplantation and Renal Haemodialysis.
 Nutritional rehabilitation
 Neonatal and Pediatric intensive care unit
 Central Intensive Care Unit (ICU) with Central Oxygen and Suction System
 Coronary Care Unit (CCU) Facilities
 Cardiology
 Angiography, Angioplasty, Cardiac Bypass, Heart Valves Replacement and all sorts of Cardiac Operations and procedures
 Heart lung lab with services of echocardiography, EET and Holter monitoring
 Lungs function lab with services of bronchoscopy procedures
 Physiotherapy and Manual therapy on both indoor and outdoor basis
 Latest Physiotherapy Equipment, Rehabilitation Center and Orthopaedic Workshop
 Neuroangiography, Electromyography (EMG), Electroencephalography (EEG) and all kind of sophisticated Neurosurgical operations
 Operations of Plastic Surgery and cosmetology Lip Augmentation, Rhioplasty)
 Dental Surgery
 All kinds of Orthopedic Operations
 All kind of Eye and Otorhinolaryngology Operations
 Surgical Operations of all kind for neonates, children, young and old patients
 Anesthesia and Pain medicine
 Rheumatology Dept. The first dedicated indoor facility for patients suffering from auto-immune disease was inaugurated at Shaikh Zayed Hospital Lahore on Wednesday 14-Mar-2017.
 All kind of diagnostic investigations

Complex
Complex comprises five Components
Shaikh Khalifa bin Zayed Al Nahyan Medical & Dental College (SKZMDC).
Shaikh Zayed Hospital Lahore (SZHL)
Shaikh Zayed Postgraduate Medical Institute (SZPGMI)
National Health Research Complex (NHRC)
National Institute of Kidney Diseases (NIKD)
Shaikha Fatima Institute of Nursing and Health Sciences (SFINHS)

Shaikh Zayed Medical Complex has a campus of 55 acres opposite of The Punjab University, Lahore comprising the Clinical & basic departments, administrative block, library, well-equipped modern lecture theaters, cafeteria etc.

For the purpose of extra- and co-curricular activities, kidney center playground is where cricket, football and hockey matches are played and many more..

References

Hospitals in Lahore
Pakistan–United Arab Emirates relations